

The Harleian genealogies are a collection of Old Welsh genealogies preserved in British Library, Harley MS 3859. Part of the Harleian Library, the manuscript, which also contains the Annales Cambriae (Recension A) and a version of the Historia Brittonum, has been dated to c. 1100, although a date of c.1200 is also possible. Since the genealogies begin with the paternal and maternal pedigrees of Owain ap Hywel Dda (d. 988), the material was probably compiled during his reign. The collection also traces the lineages of less prominent rulers of Wales and the Hen Ogledd. Some of the genealogies reappear in the genealogies from Jesus College MS 20.

See also
Bonedd Gwŷr y Gogledd
Genealogies from Jesus College MS 20
Frankish Table of Nations

References

Secondary sources
Siddons, Michael. "Genealogies, Welsh." In Celtic Culture. A Historical Encyclopedia, ed. John T. Koch. 5 vols. Santa Barbara et al., 2006. pp. 800–2.
Watkin, M., "The Chronology of the Annales Cambriae and the Liber Landavensis on the basis of their Old French Graphical Phenomena", National Library of Wales Journal 11, no.3 (1960), 181–226.
Remfry, P. M., Annales Cambriae.  A Translation of Harleian 3859; PRO E.164/1; Cottonian Domitian, A 1; Exeter Cathedral Library MS. 3514 and MS Exchequer DB Neath, PRO E.164/1.

Editions
. A copy of this text is reproduced on-line at Full-text resources for ‘Dark Age’ history, Keith Fitzpatrick-Matthews.
Bartrum, Peter C. (tr.). Early Welsh Genealogical Tracts. Cardiff: UWP, 1966. Edited versions of this translation appear at Wikisource and Mary Jones' Celtic Literature Collective.

Further reading

James, J.W. “The Harleian Ms. 3859 Genealogy II: The Kings of Dyfed down to Arthur Map Petr. died c. 586.” Bulletin of the Board of Celtic Studies 23:2 (1969), 143-52.

Medieval Welsh literature
Harleian Collection
Medieval genealogies and succession lists of Wales